The Howley Bridge is a pedestrian footbridge which spans the River Mersey in Warrington, England. It connects Howley in Warrington to Victoria Park in Latchford.

The bridge was constructed in 1912 by the London-based David Rowell & Co. It is a suspension bridge, constructed primarily of wrought iron with steel suspension cables and a timber-planked walkway.

The bridge is similar in construction, appearance and properties to other bridges made by the company, such as Daly's Bridge. The Howley Bridge also shares the shakiness for which Daly's Bridge is known.

The bridge received maintenance during the construction of the Warrington Flood defences.

The bridge is a registered Grade II listed building.

References 

Grade II listed bridges
Bridges in Cheshire
Bridges completed in 1912
Pedestrian bridges in England